Southdowns College is a private, English medium co-educational primary and high school situated in Irene, Centurion, Gauteng, South Africa. The school is part of the Independent Schools Association of Southern Africa and writes the Independent Examinations Board examinations.

Southdowns College is part of the ADvTECH Group, which also includes Tyger Valley College and Pecanwood College in Hartebeespoort.

History 
Southdowns College was established in 2007 and had pre-primary and primary schools. In 2008 they introduced a junior high school and completed the new primary school and high school buildings and an arena where southdowns has its own dance academy and music studios.

Extra-curricular activities 
Co-curricular activities include Netball, Soccer(girls & boys), swimming, rugby, chess, debating and public speaking.

Sports
Southdowns College has been performing very well on sports during the year.

The sports at the school are:
 Archery
 Athletics
 Basketball
 Chess 
 Cricket
 Cross country
 Hockey
 Netball
 Rowing 
 Rugby
 Soccer 
 Softball
 Squash 
 Swimming 
 Tennis
 Table tennis
 Water polo

External links
 

2007 establishments in South Africa
Private schools in Gauteng
City of Tshwane Metropolitan Municipality